Kaide Gordon (born 5 October 2004) is an English professional footballer who plays as a winger or attacking midfielder for  club Liverpool.

Early life
Gordon was born in Derby, Derbyshire.

Club career
Gordon joined Derby County in 2013 at under-9 level and went onto to make his senior debut on 29 December 2020, as a substitute in a 4–0 win against Birmingham City.

On 5 February 2021, it was announced that Gordon had joined Liverpool. Derby County received an undisclosed compensation fee, reported to be in the region of £1 million, rising to £3 million with add-ons. Gordon made his Liverpool debut in an EFL Cup tie at Carrow Road where Liverpool beat Norwich City 3–0 on 21 September 2021. He scored his first goal for Liverpool against Shrewsbury in his second match for Liverpool in the third round of the FA Cup, becoming Liverpool's second youngest goalscorer in all competitions, and their youngest ever scorer in the FA Cup.  He made his English Premier League debut on 16 January as a second-half substitute against Brentford.

International career
Having represented England at U16 level, Gordon made his England U18s debut during a 1–1 draw with Wales at Newport International Sports Village on 3 September 2021.

Personal life
Gordon's older brother Kellan Gordon is a professional footballer for Crawley Town.

Career statistics

References

External links

Profile at the Liverpool F.C. website

2004 births
Living people
Footballers from Derby
English footballers
England youth international footballers
Association football midfielders
Association football wingers
Derby County F.C. players
Liverpool F.C. players
English Football League players
Premier League players